The 2015 Oklahoma Sooners football team represented the University of Oklahoma in the 2015 NCAA Division I FBS football season, the 121st season of Sooner football. The team was led by two-time Walter Camp Coach of the Year Award winner, Bob Stoops, in his 17th season as head coach. They played their home games at Gaylord Family Oklahoma Memorial Stadium in Norman, Oklahoma. They were a charter member of the Big 12 Conference.

Conference play began on October 3, 2015 with a 44–24 win against West Virginia in Norman, Oklahoma and ended with a 58–23 win against Oklahoma State in Stillwater, Oklahoma on November 28, 2015. Oklahoma finished conference play with an 8–1 record winning their ninth Big 12 Championship, their first since 2012.

Oklahoma was selected as the 4th seed to play in the 2015 College Football playoff against 1st seed Clemson on December 31, 2015 in the Orange Bowl which they lost 17–37. Oklahoma finished the season with an 11–2 record.

Previous season
The 2014 Oklahoma Sooners football team finished the regular season 8–4, with the four losses in conference play towards Baylor, Kansas State, Oklahoma State, and TCU. Oklahoma became bowl eligible after defeating Iowa State on November 1, 2014. The Sooners were invited to play in the 2014 Russell Athletic Bowl against the Clemson Tigers. Oklahoma fell short against the Tigers in Orlando with a loss of 6–40.

Preseason

Recruits

Award watch lists

Lombardi Award
Dominique Alexander
Eric Striker

Jim Thorpe Award
Zack Sanchez

Butkus Award
Dominique Alexander
Erik Striker

Maxwell Award
Baker Mayfield
Samaje Perine
Sterling Shepard

Rimington Trophy
Ty Darlington

Outland Trophy
Ty Darlington

Chuck Bednarik Award
Zack Sanchez
Erik Striker
Charles Tapper

Walter Camp Award
Samaje Perine

Biletnikoff Award
Sterling Shepard

Bronko Nagurski Trophy
Dominique Alexander
Zack Sanchez
Erik Striker
Charles Tapper

Doak Walker Award
Samaje Perine

Schedule
Oklahoma announced its 2015 football schedule on November 19, 2014. The 2015 schedule consisted of six home games, five away games and one neutral game in the regular season. The Sooners hosted Big 12 foes Iowa State, TCU, Texas Tech, and West Virginia and traveled to Baylor, Kansas, Kansas State, and Oklahoma State. Oklahoma played Texas in Dallas, Texas at the Cotton Bowl for the 110th time on October 10 for the Red River Showdown.

The Sooners hosted two non-conference games against Akron and Tulsa and traveled to its other non-conference foe Tennessee in Knoxville, Tennessee. Oklahoma met for the first time against the Akron Zips at home to open the season. The Sooners then traveled to Tennessee after defeating the Tennessee Volunteers last season and then hosted in-state rival Tulsa after traveling to Tulsa last year.

Roster

Game summaries

Akron

Tennessee

Tulsa

West Virginia

Texas

Kansas State

Texas Tech

Kansas

Iowa State

Baylor

TCU

Oklahoma State (Bedlam Series)

Clemson (Orange Bowl)

Weekly Awards

Big 12 Player of the Week
Baker Mayfield (Week 3 vs Tulsa)
Baker Mayfield (Week 10 at Baylor)

Big 12 Offensive Player of the Week
Samaje Perine (Week 8 vs Texas Tech)

Big 12 Defensive Player of the Week
Zack Sanchez (Week 2 at Tennessee)
Eric Striker (Week 5 vs West Virginia)
Zack Sanchez (Week 7 vs Kansas State)
Charles Tapper (Week 8 at Kansas)
Zack Sanchez (Week 11 vs TCU)

Big 12 Special Teams Player of the Week
Austin Seibert (Week 5 vs West Virginia)

Postseason

Awards

Ty Darlington
Academic All-America (First Team)

Baker Mayfield
Burlsworth Trophy

2016 NFL Draft

The 2016 NFL Draft was held at the Auditorium Theatre and Grant Park in Chicago on April 28–30, 2016. The following Oklahoma players were either selected or signed as free agents following the draft.

Rankings

References

Oklahoma
Oklahoma Sooners football seasons
Big 12 Conference football champion seasons
Oklahoma Sooners football